Prince Rui of the First Rank, or simply Prince Rui, was the title of a princely peerage used in China during the Manchu-led Qing dynasty (1636–1912). It was also one of the 12 "iron-cap" princely peerages in the Qing dynasty, which meant that the title could be passed down without being downgraded.

The first bearer of the title was Dorgon (1612–1650), the 14th son of Nurhaci, the founder of the Later Jin dynasty. He was awarded the title in 1636 by his half-brother, Hong Taiji, who succeeded their father to the Later Jin throne and who later established the Qing dynasty. After Dorgon's death, the Shunzhi Emperor abolished the Prince Rui peerage. In 1778, the Qianlong Emperor not only restored the Prince Rui peerage, but also granted it "iron-cap" status. Chunying (died 1800), a sixth-generation descendant of Dorgon's younger brother, Dodo, was selected to inherit the Prince Rui title. The title was passed down over 12 generations and held by eight persons.

Members of the Prince Rui peerage

 Dorgon (1st), Nurhaci's 14th son, held the title Prince Rui of the First Rank from 1636 to 1650, posthumously honoured as Prince Rui Zhong of the First Rank (睿忠親王)
 Duo'erbo (多爾博; 1643 – 1673) (2nd), Dodo's fifth son, adopted as Dorgon's son, held the title of a beile from 1657 to 1673, posthumously honoured as Prince Rui of the First Rank in 1778
 Su'erfa (蘇爾發; d. 1708), Duo'erbo's second son, held the title of a beizi from 1673 to 1700, demoted to zhenguo gong in 1700, posthumously honoured as Prince Rui of the First Rank in 1778
 Saile (塞勒; d. 1729), Su'erfa's eldest son, held the title of a third class defender general from 1699 to 1708, promoted to bulwark duke in 1708, posthumously honoured as Prince Rui of the First Rank in 1778
 Gongyibu (功宜布; d. 1746), Saile's fifth son, held the title of a bulwark duke from 1744 to 1746, posthumously honoured as Fuguo Keqin Gong in 1746 and then as Prince Rui Keqin of the First Rank (睿恪勤親王) in 1778
 Rusong (如松; d. 1770), Gongyibu's son, held the title Prince Xin of the Second Rank from 1762 to 1770, posthumously honoured as Prince Xin Ke of the Second Rank in 1770 and then as Prince Rui Ke of the First Rank (睿恪親王) in 1778
 Chunying (淳穎; d. 1800) (3rd), Rusong's son, held the title of a bulwark duke from 1771 to 1778, promoted to Prince Rui of the First Rank in 1778, posthumously honoured as Prince Rui Gong of the First Rank (睿恭親王)
 Bao'en (寶恩; 1777 – 1802) (4th), Chunying's eldest son, held the title Prince Rui of the First Rank from 1801 to 1802, posthumously honoured as Prince Rui Shen of the First Rank (睿慎親王)
 Duan'en (端恩; 1788 – 1826) (5th), Chunying's second son, held the title Prince Rui of the First Rank from 1802 to 1826, posthumously honoured as Prince Rui Qin of the First Rank (睿勤親王)
 Renshou (仁壽; 1810 – 1864) (6th), Duan'en's son, held the title Prince Rui of the First Rank from 1826 to 1864, posthumously honoured as Prince Rui Xi of the First Rank (睿僖親王)
 Dechang (德長; 1838 – 1876) (7th), Renshou's son, held the title Prince Rui of the First Rank from 1865 to 1876, posthumously honoured as Prince Rui Que of the First Rank (睿愨親王)
 Kuibin (魁斌; 1864 – 1915) (8th), Dechang's son, held the title Prince Rui of the First Rank from 1876 to 1915, posthumously honoured as Prince Rui Jing of the First Rank (睿敬親王)
 Zhongquan (中銓; 1892 – 1939), Kuibin's son, held the title Prince Rui of the First Rank from 1915 to 1939
Zhongming (中銘), Kuibin's son
 Yinian (頤年; 1916 - 1987), Zhongquan's nephew, given but abandoned and rejected the title. Extinction of his line.

Family tree

See also
 Royal and noble ranks of the Qing dynasty

References
 

Qing dynasty princely peerages
Peerages of the Plain White Banner
Extinct Qing dynasty princely peerages